Mallory is an Irish surname derived from the Gaelic Ó Mallairígh. Spelling variants include Mallary, Mallery, Malorie, Mallorie, Mallerie and Mallorey. Mallory and Mallerie are also given names derived from the surname.

Surname
Arenia Mallory (1904–1977), American founder and head of what is now Saints Academy in Lexington, Mississippi, United States
Benajah Mallory (c. 1764–1853), farmer, merchant and political figure in Upper Canada
Bill Mallory (1935–), American football head coach 
Boots Mallory (1913–1958), American film actress, dancer and model 
Caitlin Mallory (1987–), American ice dancer who competes internationally for Estonia
Carole Mallory (1942–), American film actress and former model 
Clare Mallory, the penname of American children's author Winifred Constance McQuilkan Hall (1913–1991) 
Edward Mallory, born Edward Ralph Martz (1930–2007), American actor 
Francis Mallory (1807–1860), American naval officer, physician, railroad executive and U.S. Representative from Virginia
Frank Burr Mallory (1862–1941), American pathologist for whom the Mallory body is named
George Mallory (1886–1924), British mountaineer who died attempting to climb Mount Everest
George Kenneth Mallory (1900–1986), American physician for whom Mallory-Weiss syndrome is named 
James Mallory (jurist) (1916–2003), Canadian academic and constitutional expert
Jim Mallory (1918–2001), American baseball player
JP Mallory (1945–), Irish-American archaeologist and Indo-Europeanist
L. B. Mallory (1871–1933), American politician and 28th Chief Clerk of the California Assembly
Laura Mallory, an American who unsuccessfully attempted to have Harry Potter books removed from the Gwinnett County, Georgia, school system's library
Lee Mallory (1945–2005), American singer, songwriter and guitarist 
Mae Mallory (1929–2007), American Black liberation leader and member of the Workers World Party
Mark Mallory (1962–), American politician in Ohio and elected Mayor of Cincinnati, Ohio, in 2005
Michael Mallory (1955–), American author and journalist
Mike Mallory,  former American football linebacker who is currently Assistant Special Teams Coach for the New Orleans Saints
Molla Mallory (1892–1959), Norwegian-American tennis player
Penny Mallory (1966–), UK National Ladies Champion Rally Driver in 1993 and UK television presenter
Philip Mallory (1885–1975), American businessman, one of the original founders of Duracell
Robert Mallory (1815–1885), U.S. Representative from Kentucky
Ronald Mallory (1939–), American painter, holographer and sculptor 
Rufus Mallory (1831–1914), U.S. Representative from Oregon
Stephen Mallory (c. 1812–1873), U.S. Senator from Florida and Confederate Secretary of the Navy during the American Civil War
Stephen Mallory II (1848–1907), U.S. Senator and U.S. Representative from Florida
Thomas Malory (c. 1399–1471), English compiler of Le Morte d'Arthur, a book of French and English Arthurian romances
Trafford Leigh-Mallory (1892–1944), senior Royal Air Force officer during WWII
Victoria Mallory, the stage name of the American singer and actress, Vicki Morales (1948–2014)
Will Mallory (born 1999), American football player
William L. Mallory Sr. (1931–2013), the first African-American to serve as Ohio House of Representatives Majority Floor Leader

Given name
 Mallory Burdette (1991–), American tennis player
 Mallory Deluce (1989–), American ice hockey player
 Mallory Ervin (1985–), former American beauty pageant titleholder 
 Mallory Factor (1950–), American businessman and political activist
 Mallory Hagan (1988–), American beauty pageant titleholder 
 Mallory Horne (1925–2009), American politician
 Mallory Lewis (1963–), American puppeteer, television producer and writer
 Murder of Mallory Manning describes the murder of Mallory Manning (1981–2008), a New Zealand prostitute
 Daniel Mallory Ortberg (1986–), American writer and editor
 Mallory Pugh (1998–) American soccer player
 Mallory Reaves (1984–), American writer
 Mallory Snyder (1984–), American model
 Mallerie Stromswold, American politician
 Malorie Urbanovitch (1988–), Canadian fashion designer
 Mallory Weggemann (born 1989), American Paralympic swimmer
 Mallory Evan Wijesinghe (1918–2002), Sri Lankan engineer and entrepreneur

Fictional characters
 Mallory, either of two characters in the television series Sliders
 Arthur Mallory, played by Raymond Burr in the 1976 NBC series The NBC Mystery Movie 
 Brian Mallory, played by Paul Ryan Rudd in Beacon Hill (TV series)
 Delvin Mallory, a character in the video game The Elder Scrolls V: Skyrim
 Officer Edgar Mallory,  cartoon policeman in Monopoly (game)
 Edward "Leviathan" Mallory, paleontologist and explorer from the novel The Difference Engine, by William Gibson and Bruce Sterling
 Doctor Fred Mallory, played by Edwin Stanley in the 1939 serial The Phantom Creeps
 Gareth Mallory, the current M in the James Bond film franchise
 Lieutenant Colonel Greg D. Mallory in The Boys (comics)
 Katie Mallory, played by Marsha Hunt in the 1943 film Lost Angel
 Kathleen Mallory, a New York City police detective featured in a series of mystery novels by Carol O'Connell
 Captain Keith Mallory, World War II mountaineer-turned-commando in The Guns of Navarone (novel) by Alistair MacLean
 Kyler Mallory, played by Alycia Delmore in the video game Nancy Drew: The Haunting of Castle Malloy
 Lou Mallory, an innkeeper portrayed by Patricia Blair in several episodes of the Western television series The Rifleman
 Maree Mallory and Nick Mallory in Diana Wynne Jones' novels Deep Secret and The Merlin Conspiracy
 Michael Mallory, a character from the television series Sliders
 Signy Mallory, captain of the military carrier ship Norway in C. J. Cherryh's novels Downbelow Station and Merchanter's Luck
 Steven Mallory, a young sculptor in Ayn Rand's 1943 novel The Fountainhead
 Mallory, portrayed by Olivia Bonamy in the 2002 French film Bloody Mallory
 Mallory, a Brother of Dragons in fantasy author Mark Chadbourn's The Dark Ages (series)
 Mallory McMallard, an animated duck in Mighty Ducks: The Animated Series
 Mallory, a stripper portrayed by Kristen Stewart in the 2010 American drama film Welcome to the Rileys
 Mallory Danielson,  played by Laura Allen in Dirt (TV series)
 Mallory Dent, played by Sydney Tamiia Poitier in The CW television series Veronica Mars
 Mallory Grace, a character in The Spiderwick Chronicles
 Mallory Keaton, played by Justine Bateman in the 1980s American sitcom Family Ties
 Mallory Keen, a character in the Magnus Chase series by Rick Riordan
 Mallory Knox, portrayed by Juliette Lewis in the 1994 film Natural Born Killers
 Mallory O'Brien, portrayed by Allison Smith on the NBC television drama The West Wing
 Mallory "Mal" Pike, a "junior member" of The Baby-sitters Club in a series of children's books written by Ann M. Martin
 Mallory Wells, portrayed by Jessica Amlee in Heartland (TV series)
 Malory Archer, the protagonist's mother in Archer (TV series)
 Malorie, the protagonist in the novels Bird Box (novel) and Malorie (novel)
 Mallory, portrayed by Billie Lourd in American Horror Story: Apocalypse

Science and medicine 
 Mallory's trichrome stain
 Mallory body

Other
 Mallory is the conventional name for an attacker in cryptographic examples; see Alice and Bob.
 The McNabb-Mallory rule is a rule of evidence in United States law.

See also
 List of places named Mallory, a list of places categorized by region, and fictional places
 List of places named Mallory (historical), a list of historical places named Mallory which no longer exist or are known by other names

References

Given names originating from a surname
English feminine given names
English unisex given names
English-language unisex given names
Feminine given names
Masculine given names
Surnames